Seung-su, Sung-su, or Seung-soo is a Korean masculine given name. The meaning differs based on the hanja used to write each syllable of the name. There are 15 hanja with the reading "seung" and 67 hanja with the reading "soo" on the South Korean government's official list of hanja which may be used in given names.

People with this name include:
Han Seung-soo (born 1936), South Korean politician and diplomat
Kim Seung-soo (born 1973), South Korean actor
Ryu Seung-soo (born 1981), South Korean actor
Lee Seung-soo (born 1990), South Korean judoka

See also
List of Korean given names

References

Korean masculine given names